SoShy (born Deborah Sarah Epstein;), is a French singer, songwriter, actress, DJ and model.

Early life
She was born Deborah Sarah Epstein in Paris, France, on September 14, 1984, to a French-Argentine-Italian mother and a French-Russian-Ukrainian father. Her early childhood was spent in New York City and Los Angeles.

Career
SoShy, who began her career as an actress, soon discovered the art of DJing, which she did for several years. She also started singing in clubs at the age of fifteen. She then met Lone, a French producer in 2003, and from there signed a deal with Sony Music/Daylight New York. Since signing, SoShy has traveled the world for her debut album, co-writing with artists including BloodShy, Sam Waters, Walter Turbitt, Mark Ronson, Cool and Dre, Steve Kipner, Estelle, Jim Beanz, Michelle Bell, Kovas, Novel and more. She was also featured at the 2005 and 2007 MUSEXPO music conferences.

SoShy co-wrote "Strike the Match" with Ryan Tedder, from the group One Republic, for the ECHO Music Awards nominated German all-female pop band Monrose.

"Appetite for Love" was written in Gunnersbury, London in 2004 with former members of the rock group Rising Times and producer Guz Lally after songwriting stalwart Wayne Hector declined the session. The title was paraphrased from the hard rock group Guns N' Roses' debut album.

In addition, she wrote a song for the American pop rock singer Chris Cornell on his new album Scream. Also in 2009 she wrote the song "Elvis", sung by the Belgian group Leki & The Sweet Mints.

SoShy was signed to Timbaland's MosleyMusic Group/Interscope/Universal Music Group through Jimmy Iovine.

She can be heard on "Morning After Dark" which she co-wrote, the first single from Timbaland's 2009 album Shock Value II. an original version with and without Canadian singer  Nelly Furtado both were released in October 2009, and the original longer version played on kiss fm radio on air. But not the original shorter version. Her single "Dorothy" was featured on the FIFA 10 and her song "The Way I" was featured on The Official Soundtrack of FIFA 06. Soon after, they intensively promoted the hit single by performing live on TV for the MTV Music Awards, Conan O'Brien Tonight Show, followed by many live shows, such as House of Blues Los Angeles and also throughout the world.

She then signed to Sphere Musique/eOne Music in Canada from 2012 to 2014. Her debut album Crack The Code was released September 9, 2014 worldwide. The first two lead singles ("Whateva Man" and "City Of Angels") are now available on iTunes. The video for "Whateva Man" premiered on Vevo September 3, 2014.

She is currently working on her new album as well as going back to her acting and DJing career.

Discography

Studio albums

Solo singles

As featured artist

Remixes
"Morning After Dark (Chew Fu 2016 B-Boy Fix Remix)" (with Nelly Furtado & SoShy)
"Morning After Dark (French Version) (with Nelly Furtado & SoShy)

Other appearances

Writing credits

References

External links
 
 
 

1984 births
Living people
French singer-songwriters
American women singer-songwriters
American singer-songwriters
French emigrants to the United States
French people of Russian descent
French people of Italian descent
French people of Argentine descent
French people of Jewish descent
Jewish American musicians
American people of Italian descent
French women writers
21st-century American singers
21st-century French singers
21st-century American women singers
21st-century American Jews